More Tomorrow is a small village located along the Belize River in Cayo District, Belize. It was originally used as a trading post along the Belize River for travelers transporting goods from Guatemala to Belize City and then out to the Caribbean. It is approximately 5 miles from the George Price Highway, and about 20 minutes from Belmopan, the capital of Belize. According to the 2010 census, More Tomorrow has a population of 154 people in 28 households.

The village is home to a  water tower, valued at $30,000, constructed in 2014 as the culmination of a project coordinated between Gaither Evangelistic Ministries, in More Tomorrow, and Arkansas Engineers Abroad, a Registered Student Organization at the University of Arkansas. The water tower has piping connected to a nearby church and elementary school and serves as the community's first source of drinking water uncontaminated with E. coli, Staph, or fecal coliform. The sanitation of the tower's water is maintained by the community through the use of chlorine tablets and taught sanitation practices.

More Tomorrow is also the new home (as of 2018) of a Family Theme Park called "Belmopan Beach Adventure Park". The park is a privately owned park which has a natural river sandy beach area called "Secret Beach", as well as activities such as horseback and horse drawn wagon riding, river kayaking and tubing, shooting range, water slides, jungle maze, and a horse racing track.

History 
More Tomorrow's first village council was established in 1966.

References 

Populated places in Cayo District
Cayo South